Frank Mintz (born 1941) is a historian of anarchism and a labor activist.

Works 
 Histoire de la mouvance anarchiste, 1789-2012, Éditions Noir & Rouge, 2013.
 Autogestion et anarcho-syndicalisme (analyse et critiques sur l’Espagne 1931-1990), Paris, éd. CNT-RP, 1999.
Explosions de liberté, Espagne 36 - Hongrie 56, Mauléon, Acratie, 1986, .
La autogestión en la España revolucionaria, Madrid, La Piqueta, 1977.
L'autogestion dans l'Espagne révolutionnaire, Paris, Bélibaste, 1970, Paris, Maspero, 1976.
 Los Amigos de Durruti, los trotsquistas y los sucesos de mayo, in collaboration with Miguel Peciña, 1978.
 (Co-author) Actualité de Bakounine 1814-2014, Éditions du Monde libertaire, 2014, .

Anthologies
Diego Abad de Santillán - Historia y vigencia de la construcción social de un proyecto libertario (textos y documentación), Barcelona, Anthropos, 1993 (in collaboration with Antonia Fontanillas).
Noam Chomsky, Écrits politiques 1977-1983, Mauléon, Acratie, 1984 (under the pseudonym Martin Zemliak).
Errico Malatesta, Articles politiques, Paris, 10/18, 1979 (under the pseudonym Israël Renov).
Pierre Kropotkine, Œuvres, Paris, Maspero, 1976 (under the pseudonym Martin Zemliak).

References 

1941 births
Living people
Writers from Montpellier
French anarchists
Historians of anarchism